David Bush Edwards (18 August 1805 – 24 September 1850) was an English cricketer. He played for the Cambridge Town Club and was recorded in 26 first-class matches from 1826 to 1843, totalling 366 runs with a highest score of 34. He took 82 wickets with a best return of six in one innings. As an occasional wicketkeeper, he held 8 catches and completed 3 stumpings.

References

Bibliography
 
 

1805 births
1850 deaths
English cricketers
English cricketers of 1826 to 1863
Cambridge Town Club cricketers